Dilli Bahadur Chaudhary is a Nepali politician of Nepali Congress and Minister in Lumbini government. He is also serving as member of the Lumbini Province Provincial Assembly. Chaudhary was elected to the 2017 provincial assembly elections from Dang 3(A). He is currently serving as Minister for Tourism, Rural and Urban Development on 12 August 2021.

In addition to these, Chaudhary had made appreciable contribution through an NGO Backward Societ Education. He is chairman of this organisation and has won several awards and recognitions for the same.

Awards
The Ashoka Fellowship Award, USA  1992
The Reebok International Human RIghts Award, USA  1994
The Antislavery International Award, UK   2002
The Ram Krishna Jaidayal Harmony Award, India   2003
Two Nepal Government Awards:
Suprabal Gorkha Dakshin Bahu Third   1994
Suprabal Gorkha Dakshin Bahu Trishakti Patta  2004

References 

Living people
Nepali Congress politicians from Lumbini Province
Year of birth missing (living people)
Provincial cabinet ministers of Nepal
Members of the Provincial Assembly of Lumbini Province